The 2010–11 New Hampshire Wildcats men's basketball team represents the University of New Hampshire in the 2010–11 NCAA Division I men's basketball season.

Roster

Coaches

Schedule

|- align="center" bgcolor="#D8FFEB"
| 1
| November 13
| Lesley University
| W 79-47
| (No stats available) 
| (No stats available)
| (No stats available)
| Lundholm Gym, Durham, NH
| 1-0
|- align="center" bgcolor="#D8FFEB" 
| 2
| November 16
| Dartmouth
| W 55–53
| Conley – 18
| DiLiegro – 10
| Rhoads – 2
| Leede Arena, Hanover, NH (614)
| 2–0
|- align="center" bgcolor="#D8FFEB"
| 3
| November 20
| Holy Cross
| W 55–52
| Conley – 16
| DiLiegro – 9
| Bronner – 4
| Lundholm Gym, Durham, NH (1,025)
| 3–0
|- align="center" bgcolor="#FFE6E6"
| 4
| November 23
| Sacred Heart
| L 50–42
| Myrick – 10
| DiLiegro – 8
| Conley – 3
| William H. Pitt Center, Fairfield, CT (449)
| 3–1
|- align="center" bgcolor="#D8FFEB"
| 5
| November 27
| Brown
| W 70–66
| DiLiegro – 23
| DiLiegro – 12
| Rhoads – 5
| Lundholm Gym, Durham, NH (885)
| 4–1
|- align="center" bgcolor="#FFE6E6"
| 6
| November 30
| No. 9 Connecticut
| L 62–55
| Myrick – 19
| DiLiegro – 10
| Conley – 3
| Harry A. Gampel Pavilion, Storrs, CT (8,558)
| 4–2
|-

|- align="center" bgcolor="#D8FFEB"
| 7
| December 4
| Colgate 
| W 65–60
| DiLiegro – 20
| DiLiegro – 9
| Conley – 3
| Cotterell Court, Hamilton, NY (500)
| 5–2
|- align="center" bgcolor="#FFE6E6"
| 8 
| December 9
| Army 
| L 71–63
| Myrick – 13
| DiLiegro – 10
| Rhoads – 6
| Lundholm Gym, Durham, NH (917)
| 5–3
|- align="center" bgcolor="#FFE6E6"
| 9
| December 18
| Rhode Island
| L 64–52
| Conley – 16
| Benson – 7
| Benson – 2
| Ryan Center, Kingston, RI (4,274)
| 5–4
|- align="center" bgcolor="#FFE6E6"
| 10
| December 22
| Central Connecticut State
| L 71–50
| Buckley – 12
| Benson – 9
| Herrion – 2
| William H. Detrick Gymnasium, New Britain, CT (1,074)
| 5–5
|- align="center" bgcolor="#D8FFEB"
| 11
| December 29
| Cornell
| W 68–66
| Myrick – 14
| Rhoads – 6
| Rhoads – 5
| Stuart C. Siegel Center, Richmond, VA 
| 6–5
|- align="center" bgcolor="#FFE6E6"
| 12
| December 30
| VCU
| L 78–65
| Rhoads – 15
| Benson – 11
| Conley – 4
| Stuart C. Siegel Center, Richmond, VA (5,590)
| 6–6
|-

|- align="center" bgcolor="#FFE6E6"
| 13
| January 2
| Albany 
| L 59–44
| Conley – 15
| DiLiegro – 11
| Conley – 3
| SEFCU Arena Albany, NY (1,730)
| 6–7
|- align="center" bgcolor="#FFE6E6"
| 14
| January 4
| Boston University 
| L 61–54
| Conley – 14
| Benson – 8
| Conley – 4
| Case Gym, Boston, MA (401)
| 6–8
|- align="center" bgcolor="#FFE6E6"
| 15
| January 8
| Binghamton 
| L 66–61
| Conley – 16
| Benson – 8
| Conley – 3
| Lundholm Gym, Durham, NH (801)
| 6–9
|- align="center" bgcolor="#D8FFEB"
| 16
| January 11
| Hartford
| W 57–54
| Conley – 33
| DiLiegro – 11
| Rhoads – 4
| Lundholm Gym, Durham, NH (498)
| 7–9
|- align="center" bgcolor="#FFE6E6"
| 17
| January 15
| Stony Brook 
| L 64–60 2OT
| Conley – 14
| Benson – 22
| Buckley – 3 
| Pritchard Gymnasium, Stony Brook, NY (1,065)
| 7–10
|- align="center" bgcolor="#FFE6E6"
| 18
| January 20
| Vermont
| L 61–53
| Rhoads – 20
| Conley – 5
| Rhoads – 2
| Lundholm Gym, Durham, NH (538)
| 7–11
|- align="center" bgcolor="#D8FFEB"
| 19
| January 23
| UMBC
| W 80–60
| Conley – 22
| Benson – 16
| Conley – 7
| Lundholm Gym, Durham, NH (590)
| 8–11
|- align="center" bgcolor="#FFE6E6"
| 20
| January 25
| Maine 
| L 64–50
| Metagrano – 8
| DiLiegro – 9
| Rhoads – 3
| Alfond Arena, Orono, ME (1,268)
| 8–12
|- align="center" bgcolor="#D8FFEB"
| 21
| January 29
| Boston University
| W 60–48
| Conley – 26
| Benson – 9
| Rhoads – 3
| Lundholm Gym, Durham, NH (1,364)
| 9–12
|- align="center" bgcolor="#FFE6E6"
| 22
| January 31
| Vermont 
| L 63–49
| Conley – 12
| Benson – 11
| Bronner – 5
| Patrick Gym, Burlington, VT (2,484)
| 9–13
|-

|- align="center" bgcolor="#D8FFEB"
| 23
| February 2
| Albany
| W 62-59 OT
| Rhoades - 15
| Benson - 14
| Bronner - 6
| Lundholm Gym, Durham, NH 
| 10-13
|- align="center" bgcolor="#D8FFEB"
| 24
| February 5
| Binghamton  
| W 65-59
| Conley - 22
| DiLiegro - 10
| Bronner - 3
| Binghamton University Events Center, Binghamton, NY
| 11-13
|- align="center" bgcolor="#FFE6E6"
| 25
| February 9
| Stony Brook 
| L 63-56
| Conley - 17
| DiLiegro & Benson - 7
| Conley - 3
| Lundholm Gym, Durham, NH
| 11-14
|- align="center" bgcolor="#D8FFEB"
| 26
| February 12
| UMBC 
| W 63-46
| Conley - 25
| DiLiegro - 12
| Rhoads - 6
| Retriever Activities Center, Cantonsville, MD
| 12-14
|- align="center" bgcolor="#FFE6E6"
| 27
| February 19
| Marist 
| L 58-49
| Rhoads - 16 
| Benson - 10
| Conley & Rhoads - 3
| McCann Arena, Poughkeepsie, NY
| 12-15
|- align="center" bgcolor="#FFE6E6"
| 28
| February 22
| Maine 
| L 70-53
| Conley - 16
| DiLiegro - 11
| Rhoads - 4
| Lundholm Gymnasium, Durham, NH
| 12-16
|- align="center" bgcolor="#FFE6E6"
| 29
| February 29
| Hartford
| L 62=54
| Conley & Benson - 16
| Benson - 15
| Rhoads - 5
| Chase Arena at Reich Family Pavilion, West Hartford, CT
| 12-17
|-

|-
! colspan="2" | 2010–11 team schedule
|}

References

New Hampshire
New Hampshire Wildcats men's basketball seasons
Wild
Wild